Güney Waterfall is a waterfall in Denizli Province, western Turkey. It is a registered natural monument of the country.

Location and access
The waterfall is located in the Cindere village of the Güney district of Denizli Province. The road to the waterfall is paved with cobblestones.

Waterfall
The carbonated water dissolved limestone formation rocks and formed travertines on the waterfall base. A cave situated under the waterfall contains a pond.

It is a popular visitor attraction. Around 20,000 local and foreign tourists visit the site annually.

In the summer of 2007, the waterfall faced the risk of disappearance due to drought in the region. The -high rock wall of the waterfall collapsed following a landslide, which occurred in the afternoon of May 13, 2013. As a result of the rockfall, the waterfall almost disappeared. One person at the site sustained light injuries. Facilities were added to the site for outdoor recreation. The waterfall area was also illuminated to accommodate nighttime visitors.

References

Waterfalls of Turkey
Landforms of Denizli Province
Natural monuments of Turkey
Tourist attractions in Denizli Province
Protected areas established in 1994
1994 establishments in Turkey